Jean-Claude Andro (1937, Quimper – 2000) was a French writer. He published his first novel at 22 and then left to teach in Mexico (1960–62). He then pursued a career as a novelist and translator (Zone sacrée and Chant des aveugles by Carlos Fuentes and Christ des ténèbres by Rosario Castellanos).

In 1998 he was awarded the prix Henri de Régnier bestowed by the Académie française for all his work. In addition to this prize, he was also awarded the Prix Amic (1993 and 1996) and the Prix Mottard (1995) by this same Académie.

Bibliography 
1959: Les Vacances interdites, Plon
1968: La Mer des Sargasses, Éditions Denoël, Prix Bretagne
1969: La Neige autour, Denoël
1971: le vent dans les arbres, Flammarion
1972: L’Esprit du lieu, Flammarion
1977: La Maison profonde, Flammarion: Grand Prix de l’Académie de Bretagne
1983: Des Masques dans un bal, Flammarion
1992: La Région des grands lacs, Flammarion  	
1992: L’Esprit du lieu, Flammarion
1992: Toutes les salles de la forêt, Flammarion 
1992: Les Fontaines écarlates, Flammarion

References 

Writers from Quimper
20th-century French novelists
20th-century French male writers
Spanish–French translators
1937 births
2000 deaths
20th-century translators